Shradha Sharma is an Indian journalist. She is the founder and CEO of YourStory.

Early life and education 
Sharma was born in Patna, Bihar, India. She shifted to New Delhi in 1997. She did a bachelor's and master's degree in history from St. Stephen's College, Delhi. She did her master's degree from Mudra Institute of Communications Ahmedabad .

Career 
Sharma started her career being a brand advisor at The Times of India. After that, she was an assistant vice president at the business channel CNBC TV18 . In 2008, she found her news portal YourStory.

Awards 

 Fortune 40 under 40.

References 

Living people
Indian company founders
21st-century Indian journalists
Indian journalists
Year of birth missing (living people)
People from Patna